The 1994–95 Scottish Cup was the 110th staging of Scotland's most prestigious football knockout competition. The Cup was won by Celtic after defeating Airdrieonians in the final.

First round

Replays

Second round

Replays

Third round

Replays

Fourth round

Quarter-finals

Semi-finals

Replay

Final

See also
1994–95 in Scottish football
1994–95 Scottish League Cup

Scottish Cup seasons
Scottish Cup, 1994-95
Scot